Dari is a variety of Persian spoken in Afghanistan.

Dari may also refer to:

People
Achraf Dari (born 1999), a Moroccan footballer
Dari Alexander (born 1969), American TV news anchor
Dari Nowkhah (born 1976), American TV sports anchor
Dari Taylor (born 1944), British politician

Places
Dari, Iran
Dari, Jharkhand, India
Dari County, or Darlag County, Qinghai province, China

Other uses

Dari, or dhurrie, a thin flat-woven rug or carpet used traditionally in South Asia as floor-coverings
Dari, or dhari, dancer's headdress featured on the Torres Strait Islander Flag
DARI, dopamine reuptake inhibitor, a drug
Dari, a name for commercial sorghum
Dari (band), an Italian music group
Zoroastrian Dari language, an ethnolect of the Zoroastrians of Yazd and Kerman, Iran
Dari Mart, a chain of convenience stores in Oregon, U.S.

See also

Daria (disambiguation)
Deri (disambiguation)
Daris, a male given name 
Dary, a given name and surname